Muskiz is a town and municipality located in the province of Biscay, in the autonomous community of Basque Country, northern Spain.

Neighborhoods 
Muskiz is administratively divided into six neighborhoods or wards:

Demography

Economy 

In the 1970s the petrochemical company Petronor built a refinery with a 222 metres tall chimney called La Catalítica.

Notable people 
Nicolás de la Quadra

JOSE RAMON CAMPOS MARTIN Painter

https://bigfoot.ch/2022/06/jose-ramon-campos-martin/

References

External links

 MUSKIZ in the Bernardo Estornés Lasa - Auñamendi Encyclopedia (Euskomedia Fundazioa) 
  

Municipalities in Biscay
Estuary of Bilbao